Grim – Stroke – Disease is the debut studio album of Swamp Terrorists, released in February 1991 by Machinery Records. Graeme Kay of Q Magazine was critical of the effort, noting how the 11 tracks  "lack the personality to qualify as anything more that an anonymous part of a not very memorable whole".

Track listing

Personnel
Adapted from the Grim – Stroke – Disease liner notes.

Swamp Terrorists
 Michael Antener (as STR) – sampler, drum programming, sequencing, production, recording, mixing, mastering, design
 Ane Hebeisen (as Ane H.) – lead vocals, production, recording, mixing, mastering, design

Production and design
 Jor Jenka (as Jor) – executive-producer
 Ludwig – design
 Klaus Röthlisberger – recording, mixing and mastering (6, 8)
 Hans Ulrich – recording, mixing and mastering (1-5, 7, 9-16)

Release history

References

External links 
 

1991 debut albums
Swamp Terrorists albums
Machinery Records albums